Gwyneth Horder-Payton is an American television director.

Beginning in the late 1980s she worked as an assistant director on a number of films such as Pacific Heights, The Doors, Raising Cain, I Love Trouble, Homeward Bound II: Lost in San Francisco and other films.

She made her television directorial debut on the FX series The Shield, on which she was working as a first AD. Some of her subsequent television directing credits include The Riches, Bionic Woman, My Own Worst Enemy, Fringe, Battlestar Galactica, Criminal Minds, The Unit, Cold Case, Numb3rs, Blue Bloods, Sons of Anarchy, The Walking Dead, The Killing, NYC 22, Once Upon a Time, Hawaii Five-0, American Horror Story, Feud: Bette and Joan, 9-1-1, The Politician, 9-1-1: Lone Star and Big Sky.

Horder-Payton is the granddaughter of actor Victor McLaglen (The Informer), and the niece of director Andrew V. McLaglen (Shenandoah).

Filmography

References

External links

Living people
American television directors
American women television directors
Place of birth missing (living people)
1962 births